Ianthodon is an extinct genus of basal haptodontiform synapsids from the Late Carboniferous about 304 million years ago. The taxon was discovered and named by Kissel & Reisz in 2004. The only species in the taxon, Ianthodon schultzei, was found by separating it from a block that also contained the remains of Petrolacosaurus and Haptodus. The evolutionary significance of the taxon wasn't realized until a publication in 2015. The fossil of this organism was discovered in Garnett, Kansas.

Description

Ianthodon was first named by Kissel & Reisz in 2004, and a more detailed specimen was reevaluated in 2014. This single juvenile skeleton with delicate bones has an estimated skull length of around 10 cm, which is similar to other taxa, such as Haptodus, during the same development stage. The specimen was easily distinguished from the skeletal element of Petrolacosaurus by the position and the proportion of foreman and supinator process in the humeri.

Skull 

Ianthodon was identified as the basalmost known sphenacodont. It can be distinguished from Haptodus by its narrower skull and dentition. The higher number of precaninie maxillary teeth and the more rectangular shape of the humerus distinguish the holotype of H. garnettensis from that of Ianthodon. The teeth of Ianthodon have wide bases but slender crowns, unusual among contemporary amniotes and indicating that Ianthodon occupied a different trophic niche from the bulbous-crowned Haptodus to which it was closely related. Like other sphenacodonts, Ianthodon has a tall lacrimal bone, and so would have had a proportionally taller snout than more basal synapsids such as varanopids and eothyridids.

Classification 

Ianthodon belongs to the clade Sphenodontia within the clade Sphenocomorpha. It played an important role in understanding the initial evolution of Sphenacodonts. It also provided important evidence of the reptilian-mammal transition. The cladogram below follows a cladistic analysis by Spindler and colleagues.

Paleobiology and evolutionary significance 
The clear morphological evidence of the new material initialize the finalization of the understanding of the radiation of the Sphenacomorpha, and the evolution of that led to the emergence of mammal. So based on the information, it was concluded that basal Sphenacomorphs came from a generalist form with a great potential for adaptions. However, the understanding of Ianthodon and basal Sphenacodonts are still relatively limited by the number of the specimen available for study and further excavation of Garnett fauna is required, despite the present evidence suggests that Ianthodon represents the primitive condition of sphenacodont evolution, more studies are require for a better understanding of this particular stage of synapids evolution.

See also

 List of pelycosaurs
 List of therapsids

References

Prehistoric sphenacodonts
Prehistoric synapsid genera
Carboniferous synapsids
Fossil taxa described in 2004